The 1965 Paris–Roubaix was the 63rd edition of the Paris–Roubaix cycle race and was held on 11 April 1965. The race started in Compiègne and finished in Roubaix. The race was won by Rik van Looy of the Solo–Superia team.

General classification

References

Paris–Roubaix
Paris-Roubaix
Paris-Roubaix
Paris-Roubaix
Paris-Roubaix